Yabareh (also Romanized as Yabāreh, Yebareh, and Yobāreh; also known as Boneh-ye Yabāreh and Boneh-ye Yūbārā) is a village in Miyan Ab-e Shomali Rural District, in the Central District of Shushtar County, Khuzestan Province, Iran. At the 2006 census, its population was 288, in 43 families.

References 

Populated places in Shushtar County